Vedika Pinto is an Indian actress. Her first film was the Bollywood thriller Operation Romeo. Her next film will be Gumraah, a remake of Thadam opposite Aditya Roy Kapur.

References

External links
 

Indian film actresses
21st-century Indian actresses
Year of birth missing (living people)
Living people